The discography of Ani DiFranco, a United States-based singer-songwriter, consists of 22 studio albums (two of which were collaborations with Utah Phillips), four live albums (excluding dozens of bootlegs), three compilation albums, and three extended plays.

Albums

Studio albums

With Utah Phillips

Live albums

Compilation albums

Extended plays

Notes

References

Discographies of American artists